Kushk Dasht (also Romanized as Kūshk Dasht) is a village in Alamut-e Pain Rural District, Rudbar-e Alamut District, Qazvin County, Qazvin Province, Iran. At the 2006 census, its population was 122, in 47 families.

References 

Populated places in Qazvin County